John Floyd Webb (born May 23, 1979), is a former Major League Baseball pitcher. He played in MLB from - for the Tampa Bay Devil Rays.

In , Webb played for the Chicago Cubs Triple-A affiliate, the Iowa Cubs, and became a free agent after the season. In , Webb pitched for the Pensacola Pelicans of the independent American Association.

External links

1979 births
Living people
Major League Baseball pitchers
Baseball players from Florida
Arizona League Cubs players
Eugene Emeralds players
Lansing Lugnuts players
Daytona Cubs players
West Florida Argonauts baseball players
West Tennessee Diamond Jaxx players
Durham Bulls players
Memphis Redbirds players
Iowa Cubs players
SCF Manatees baseball players
Tampa Bay Devil Rays players
Pensacola Pelicans players

State College of Florida, Manatee–Sarasota alumni
Algodoneros de Guasave players
American expatriate baseball players in Mexico
Dmedia T-REX players
Mesa Solar Sox players
Montgomery Biscuits players
American expatriate baseball players in Taiwan